Alec Edward Shelbrooke  (born 10 January 1976) is a British Conservative politician who has been Member of Parliament for Elmet and Rothwell since 2010. He served as Minister of State for Defence Procurement in the Ministry of Defence from September 2022 to October 2022.

Early life

Born in 1976 in Bromley, South London, Shelbrooke was educated at Saint George's Church of England Comprehensive School, Gravesend, and graduated with a degree in Mechanical Engineering from Brunel University in 1998. After leaving university, Shelbrooke worked as a kitchen and bathroom fitter, and later as a project administrator at the University of Leeds.

Political career

He has fought four local government elections (being elected to Leeds City Council in 2004 and re-elected in 2006 as Councillor for Harewood Ward) and unsuccessfully stood in Wakefield at the 2005 General Election. He was Deputy Chairman of Elmet Conservative Association from 2001 to 2004.

After entering parliament, in November 2010 Shelbrooke was confirmed as Parliamentary Private Secretary (PPS) to Minister of State for Transport Theresa Villiers.

In September 2012, Shelbrooke was made PPS to Minister of State for Northern Ireland, Mike Penning. He announced his delight at taking over the responsibility for "Northern Island" [sic] on Twitter and later blamed the spelling mistake on autocorrect.

In December 2012, Shelbrooke introduced a Ten Minute Rule bill under which UK welfare claimants would be issued with a cash card instead of receiving their benefits in cash. The card would only permit claimants to make purchases such as food, clothing, energy, travel and housing, and prevent them purchasing items considered non-essential, such as cigarettes, alcohol, satellite television, and gambling.

He became PPS to the Foreign Office in 2014. Shelbrooke was opposed to the UK leaving the European Union prior to the 2016 referendum.

In 2016, Shelbrooke commissioned a report written by Mark McBride-Wright quantifying the impact of homophobia within the engineering industry.

In 2017, he became Vice Chairman (International) of the Conservative Party, a soft-power role designed to promote the UK's interests overseas as well as supporting centre-right political parties in the developing world through the Westminster Foundation for Democracy. Shelbrooke remains an officer of the International Democrat Union.

Shelbrooke was an Executive Member of the 1922 Committee during a period of turbulence within the Conservative Party leading to the resignation of Prime Minister Theresa May in 2019. He was appointed to the Privy Council in Theresa May's retirement honours list. Shelbrooke backed Jeremy Hunt in the 2019 Conservative Party leadership election that followed.

In 2020, Shelbrooke was appointed Leader of the UK Delegation to the NATO Parliamentary Assembly.

In July 2022, Shelbrooke rebelled from the government for the first time in his parliamentary career by voting against the approval of the Conduct of Employment Agencies and Employment Businesses (Amendment) Regulations 2022.

On 7 September 2022, he was appointed Minister of State in the Ministry of Defence as part of the Truss administration because of his overt support for Liz Truss in her leadership campaign. Shelbrooke was then immediately sacked on 26 October 2022 by the new Prime Minister, Rishi Sunak and returned to the back benches.

References

External links

Conservative Part Website – Official Profile
Alec Shelbrooke's Twitter Account

 

1976 births
Living people
Alumni of Brunel University London
Conservative Party (UK) MPs for English constituencies
UK MPs 2010–2015
UK MPs 2015–2017
UK MPs 2017–2019
UK MPs 2019–present
Councillors in Leeds
People from Gravesend, Kent
Deaf politicians
English deaf people
Members of the Privy Council of the United Kingdom